T. V. Parthasarathi (11 November 1916 – 5 December 1988) was an Indian cricketer. He played first-class cricket for Bengal, Madras and Mysore.

See also
 List of Bengal cricketers

References

External links
 

1916 births
1988 deaths
Indian cricketers
Bengal cricketers
Tamil Nadu cricketers
Karnataka cricketers
Place of birth missing